When the Road Bends… Tales of a Gypsy Caravan is a 2006 documentary film directed by Jasmine Dellal about Gypsy musicians in the United States.

Content 
The film follows Gypsy musicians in five bands on concert tour across the United States. The film includes live performances, backstage scenes, scenes with the musicians' families in India, Spain, Macedonia and Romania, and interviews. Musician, Esma Redžepova appear. It includes an interview of Johnny Depp.
Also includes appearances from:

 Taraf de Haïdouks
 Esma Redžepova
 Fanfare Ciocărlia
 Maharaja (including Queen Harish)
 Antonio El Pipa Flemenco Ensemble featuring cantaora Juana la del Pipa "who is related to the Parrilla guitar-playing family and both the Zambo and Terremoto singing clans."
 Johnny Depp
 George Eli

Production 
It was directed by Jasmine Dellal, co-produced by Dellal and Sara P. Nolan. It was executive produced by San Fu Maltha, Wouter Barendrecht, and Michael J. Werner. The company that produced it was Little Dust Productions in association with ITVS, Fu Works Filmrights and Fortissimo Films. It was filmed by Albert Maysles, Alain de Halleux, and Dellal.

Release 
It was released in North America in 2006. It was released on 2007 in the United Kingdom.

Reception 
According to Rotten Tomatoes the critic consensus was "A dynamic doc following five Romani bands is a pleasure for the senses thanks to vibrant colors and eclectic music".

References

External links 
 
 

American documentary films
2006 films
2006 documentary films
Documentary films about Romani people
Films about Romani people
2000s English-language films
2000s American films